Christian Yu (born September 6, 1990), also known as DPR Ian, is an Australian singer, rapper, and director based in South Korea. He is a former member of Yedang Entertainment boy group C-Clown, which was active between 2012 and 2015. Yu made his solo debut under his co-founded label Dream Perfect Regime (DPR) with the digital single "So Beautiful" on October 26, 2020. His first studio album Moodswings In To Order was released on July 29, 2022. He was the 10th most streamed Kpop Male Solo Artist Globally on Spotify in 2022.

Early life 
DPR Ian was born in Sydney, Australia on September 6, 1990, and was raised by his mother after his parents separated when he was young. Yu attended Wollongong High School of the Performing Arts and played in a heavy metal band, where he was influenced by the musicals and circuses he attended as a child. In 2008, when he was 18, he started uploading videos to his YouTube channel, going by the name of B Boy B.yu. After graduating from high school, Yu studied science and art at the University of Sydney for one year before dropping out. He then moved to South Korea to pursue dancing, initially having no intention of becoming a K-pop idol. However, this changed when he was street cast by an entertainment agency; when he auditioned, he couldn’t sing but he was able to impress with his dancing abilities.

Career 
Yu debuted as the leader of K-pop group C-Clown under the stage name Rome, which was derived from his Korean name "Ba-rom". The 6-member boy group debuted in 2012 and was the first idol group created by entertainment agency Yedang Entertainment, which would later be renamed Banana Culture Entertainment. After C-Clown disbanded in October 2015, Yu along with Live, Cream, and REM established the label Dream Perfect Regime, all of whom attach the label's acronym—DPR—to their names. In 2021, he released his debut extended play Moodswings in This Order. He released his first studio album Moodswings In To Order in 2022. 

Yu is behind the visual arts for the DPR crew and directs all DPR music videos such as Live's "Jasmine", "Legacy", and "Yellow Cab" along with his own songs, like "So Beautiful", "No Blueberries", and "Ballroom Extravaganza". He has also directed and edited music videos for artists outside of DPR including Bobby's "HOLUP", Mino's "Body", and Taeyang's "Wake Me Up". 

In 2021, DPR Ian and Live released the track "Diamonds + and Pearls" as part of the soundtrack to the Marvel Film Shang-Chi and the Legend of the Ten Rings. This marked the duo—along with fellow artists on the album—becoming two of the first Korean artists to participate in a Marvel soundtrack album.

Artistry 
DPR Ian was diagnosed with bipolar disorder when he was a teenager. He later created an alter ego, Mito, to reflect his own mental disorder. In an interview with Billboard, he said that “I wanted to portray a character dealing with various mental disorders which may be deemed negative or dark in a realistic sense but at the same time can also be seen as superpowers in a different light.”

Discography

Studio albums

Extended plays

Singles

Tours 
 The Regime World Tour (with DPR Live & DPR Cream) (2022)

Awards and nominations

References 

1990 births
Living people
21st-century rappers
21st-century Australian singers
21st-century Australian male singers
21st-century Australian dancers
Musicians from Sydney
Rappers from Sydney
Singers from Sydney
Australian people of Korean descent
Australian emigrants to South Korea
Australian expatriates in South Korea
People with bipolar disorder
Korean-language singers
K-pop singers
South Korean male idols
Australian male rappers
Australian male dancers
Australian male singers
Australian pop singers
Australian hip hop singers
Australian rhythm and blues singers
Australian record producers
Australian music industry executives
Australian company founders